Park Eun-kyung may refer:

 Park Eun-kyung (field hockey) (born 1975), South Korean field hockey player
  (born 1976), South Korean announcer of SBS
 Park Eun-kyung (gymnast)  (born 1991), South Korean artistic gymnast
Park Eun-kyung (nail artist), South Korean nail artist